Eden Futsal Club  is an Irish futsal club based in Blanchardstown, Fingal. The club played under various names including English in Dublin, Sporting Fingal EID, EID Futsal and Eden College. In 2008 they were founder members of the Emerald Futsal League and between 2010 and 2014 they won the FAI Futsal Cup five times in a row. As a result, they also represented the Republic of Ireland in the UEFA Futsal Cup on five consecutive occasions between 2010–11 and 2014–15.

History

Emerald Futsal League
In 2008 English in Dublin were founding members of the Emerald Futsal League. They were effectively the futsal team of an English language school of the same name based in Merrion Square.  In 2009 they became affiliated with Sporting Fingal F.C. and began playing as Sporting Fingal EID. After the Sporting Fingal League of Ireland team disbanded, the futsal team continued to play as EID Futsal. Playing as EID Futsal they won their first Emerald Futsal League title in 2011, defeating Shamrock Rovers 3–1 in the final. In 2012 the club became affiliated to Eden College, another English language school. Playing as Eden Futsal Club, the club won a second league title in 2014, this time after defeating Transylvania 6–5 in the final.

FAI Futsal Cup
In 2010 Sporting Fingal EID won the FAI Futsal Cup after defeating Blue Magic 4–2 in the final. As EID Futsal they also won the 2011 and 2012 FAI Futsal Cups, again defeating Blue Magic in both finals. Playing as Eden College and then as then as Eden Futsal, the club won two further FAI Futsal Cups in 2013 and 2014. In the finals they defeated Shamrock Rovers and FCG Dublin Futsal respectively

UEFA Futsal Cup
As a result of winning the FAI Futsal Cup five times in a row between 2010 and 2014, Eden also represented the Republic of Ireland in the UEFA Futsal Cup on five consecutive occasions between 2010–11 and 2014–15. In 2010–11 and 2012–13 they won their preliminary groups and qualified for the main round. On the other three occasions, they finished as runners up in their preliminary groups. In 2014–15 they also acted as host of their group.

2010–11
In the 2010–11 UEFA Futsal Cup preliminary round Sporting Fingal EID travelled to Kaunas and after defeating the host team, FK Nautara Kaunas, and FC Kaghsi Yerevan (Armenia), 5–3 and 7–3 respectively, they won their group. In doing so they became the first team from the Republic of Ireland to progress beyond the preliminary round. However they failed to impress in the main round and lost all three of their games.

Preliminary round – Group A

Main Round – Group 3

2011–12
In the 2011–12 UEFA Futsal Cup  EID Futsal finished as runners up in their group.

Preliminary round – Group B

2012–13
In the 2012–13 UEFA Futsal Cup EID Futsal won their preliminary group and qualified for the main round for second time. However once they again they finished fourth.

Preliminary round – Group C

Main Round – Group 6

2013–14
In the 2013–14 UEFA Futsal Cup Eden College finished as runners up in their preliminary group.

Preliminary round – Group F

2014–15
The 2014–15 UEFA Futsal Cup saw Eden Futsal host their preliminary group. The tournament was held at the National Basketball Arena between 25 August and 29 August 2014. Eden subsequently finished as runners up in the group.
Preliminary round – Group A

Notable players

2014 squad

Head Coach  Rodrigo de Melo

Republic of Ireland internationals

Honours
FAI Futsal Cup 
Winners: 2010, 2011, 2012, 2013, 2014 : 5
Emerald Futsal League 
Winners: 2011, 2014: 2
Runners Up: 2013: 1
UEFA Futsal Cup Preliminary Group 
Winners: 2010–11, 2012–13: 2
Runners Up: 2011–12, 2013–14, 2014–15: 3
PELE Sports Dublin Futsal Cup 
Winners: 2011: 1

References

Futsal clubs in the Republic of Ireland
University and college association football clubs in the Republic of Ireland
Futsal clubs established in 2008
2008 establishments in Ireland
Sporting Fingal F.C.